Cosham railway station serves Cosham, a northern suburb of the city of Portsmouth, Hampshire in southern England.

Opened in 1848 by the London and South Western Railway (LSWR), it is located on the West Coastway Line which runs between Brighton and Southampton. It is currently served by the South Western Railway, Southern, and Great Western Railway train operating companies.

The station used to have a small goods yard which served local freight trains around Portsmouth. Today all that remains is an old loading gauge, with the original site being built upon.

Services 

The typical off-peak service in trains per hour is:
 1 tph to  via 
 1 tph to  via 
 1 tph to  via 
 3 tph to 
 1 tph to  via 

During the evenings, most Great Western Railway services do not stop at Cosham.

Westward, the line through Cosham leads to Portchester and Fareham, eastward to a junction (part of the local "Railway Triangle") between lines leading south to Hilsea and Portsmouth and east to Bedhampton and Havant.

Gallery

References

External links 

Railway stations in Portsmouth
DfT Category D stations
Former Portsmouth and Ryde Joint Railway stations
Railway stations in Great Britain opened in 1848
Railway stations served by Great Western Railway
Railway stations served by Govia Thameslink Railway
Railway stations served by South Western Railway